Jarrett Lee Hoffpauir (born June 18, 1983) is an American former professional baseball second baseman. He is a distant cousin to Micah Hoffpauir, who is also a baseball player.

Hoffpauir was drafted by the St. Louis Cardinals in the 6th round of the 2004 Major League Baseball Draft from the University of Southern Mississippi following his junior year, during which he hit .405 with 92 RBI and was named to the All-Conference Tournament Team.  Hoffpauir currently holds Southern Mississippi single-season records for most hits (109) and most RBI (92).

He was recalled to join the Cardinals on July 1, 2009, and made his debut in Cincinnati on July 3.

Jarrett was claimed off waivers by the Toronto Blue Jays on November 3, 2009

On April 25, 2010, he hit for the cycle for Triple-A Las Vegas against Sacramento, going 4-5. On May 28, 2010 he hit for the cycle again against Tacoma, going 4-4.

On June 20, 2010, the Blue Jays purchased Hoffpauir's contract and optioned Edwin Encarnación to Las Vegas.

On October 6, 2010, Hoffpauir was claimed off waivers by the San Diego Padres.

Hoffpauir signed a minor league contract with the Washington Nationals on December 14, 2011. After becoming a free agent, Hoffpauir signed a minor league contract with the Blue Jays on January 25, 2013, but was released soon after.

References

External links

1983 births
Living people
Baseball players from Mississippi
American expatriate baseball players in Canada
Major League Baseball second basemen
Memphis Redbirds players
St. Louis Cardinals players
Toronto Blue Jays players
Major League Baseball third basemen
People from Natchez, Mississippi
Southern Miss Golden Eagles baseball players
New Jersey Cardinals players
Peoria Chiefs players
Palm Beach Cardinals players
Swing of the Quad Cities players
Springfield Cardinals players
Las Vegas 51s players
Tucson Padres players
Syracuse Chiefs players